Farkadona (before 1955: Τσιότι) is a municipality in the southeastern Trikala regional unit, part of Thessaly in Greece.  In 2011 its population was 2,652 for the town and 13,396 for the municipality. It is located about halfway between the cities Larissa to the east, and Trikala to the west, at about 30 km from both. It is situated in the Thessalian Plain, near the river Pineios. Farkadona is on the Greek National Road 6 (Larissa - Trikala - Ioannina - Igoumenitsa).

Municipality
The municipality Farkadona was formed at the 2011 local government reform by the merger of the following 3 former municipalities, that became municipal units:
Farkadona
Oichalia
Pelinnaioi

The municipality has an area of 368.674 km2, the municipal unit 219.776 km2.

Subdivisions
The municipal unit of Farkadona is divided into the following communities:
Achladochori
Grizano
Diasello
Farkadona
Keramidi
Panagitsa
Pineias
Zarko

Population

History
Farkadona is named after the ancient Thessalian town Pharcadon ( - Pharkadon). The ruins of ancient Pharcadon are located on a hill near the village of Klokotos, 5 km southwest of the modern town. The modern town of Farkadona was known as Tsioti before 1955.

External links
Farkadona (municipality) on GTP Travel Pages
Farkadona (town) on GTP Travel Pages

References

Municipalities of Thessaly
Populated places in Trikala (regional unit)